Adam de Toneworth (also Toueworth or Towworth) was an English medieval university chancellor.

Adam de Toneworth was Chancellor of the University of Oxford several times between 1366 and 1379. As Chancellor of Oxford, he was involved with the John Wycliffe controversy.

References

Year of birth unknown
Year of death unknown
Chancellors of the University of Oxford
14th-century English people